Miles Brown (born September 4, 1997) is an American professional Canadian football nose tackle for the Saskatchewan Roughriders of the Canadian Football League (CFL). He played college football at Wofford and was signed by the Arizona Cardinals as an undrafted free agent in 2019.

Early life
Brown was born on September 4, 1997 and went to high school at Sidwell Friends School in Washington D.C. where he started all four years of high school totaling 97 tackles, 12 sacks and two INTs as a senior. He also played Running back in high school in which he totaled 136 carries for 1,012 yards, 22 receptions for 314 yards and 28 total TDs. He also was a member of the wrestling team where he went 23–0 as a junior.

College career
Brown went to Wofford for his college career where in all four seasons he started 49 of 50 played games where he recorded 174 total tackles, recorded 38 tackles for loss and 13.5 sacks in his career. Brown was a first-team All-Southern Conference and two-time third-team All-American selection.

Professional career

Arizona Cardinals
After going undrafted in the 2019 NFL draft, he signed with the Arizona Cardinals of the National Football League. After making the Cardinals roster, Brown played in three games before being waived on October 1, 2019 and re-signed to the practice squad. On November 13, 2019, Brown was promoted to the active roster after Zach Allen was placed on injured reserve.

On September 4, 2020, Brown was waived by the Cardinals.

Tennessee Titans
On November 10, 2020, the Tennessee Titans signed Brown to their practice squad. His practice squad contract with the team expired after the season on January 18, 2021.

Detroit Lions
On August 6, 2021, Brown signed with the Detroit Lions. He was waived on August 30, 2021 and re-signed to the practice squad, but released the following day.

Saskatchewan Roughriders 
On February 25, 2022, Brown signed with the Saskatchewan Roughriders.

References

External links
Wofford Terriers bio
Arizona Cardinals bio

1997 births
Living people
Arizona Cardinals players
Detroit Lions players
People from Cheverly, Maryland
Players of American football from Maryland
Sportspeople from the Washington metropolitan area
Tennessee Titans players
Wofford Terriers football players
Saskatchewan Roughriders players